(formerly Aster lateriflorus) is a species of flowering plant in the aster family (Asteraceae).

The flowers of calico aster are small compared to most Symphyotrichum species. They have an average of  white ray florets, which are rarely tinted pink or purple. The flower centers, composed of disk florets, begin as cream to yellow and often become pink, purple, or brown as they mature. There are roughly  florets, each with five lobes that strongly reflex (bend backwards) when open. The mostly hairless leaves have a characteristic hairy midrib on their back faces, and branching is usually horizontal or in what can appear to be a zigzag pattern. Flower heads grow along one side of the branches and sometimes in clusters at the ends.

Symphyotrichum lateriflorum is a conservationally secure species and grows in a variety of habitats. It can be found throughout most of the eastern and east-central United States and Canada. There is also a native population in the state of Veracruz, Mexico. Its late-summer and fall appearing flowers are visited by small pollinators and nectar-seeking insects such as sweat bees, miner bees, and hoverflies. As well as occurring naturally in several varieties, S. lateriflorum has multiple cultivars and has been grown for at least  in Europe. Some modern-day cultivars are 'Bleke Bet', 'Lady in Black', and 'Prince'. It has been used by Indigenous peoples of the Americas as a medicinal plant.

Description
Herbaceous and with alternate leaves, it can have a different appearance throughout its lifespan or a season. For example, a mature or returning plant, or one late in the season, may have one or more stiff stems that reach close to maximum height, several arching branches, and multiple clusters of flowers (inflorescences). An early or first-year plant may have one short and somewhat floppy stem, several large leaves, and end abruptly with one flower head in the center.

Roots
The roots of Symphyotrichum lateriflorum have short and woody branched caudices, and can have short rhizomes that may produce offsets. The images of caudices are from dried specimens of  that are stored in the New York Botanical Garden (NYBG) Steere Herbarium.

Stems
Symphyotrichum lateriflorum has from one to five stems growing from the root base. These stems can be a reddish or purplish color, often with a woody appearance, or a shade of green. Characteristics can depend on the prevalence of sun, with the green stems occurring more likely in the shade.

Slender and wiry inflorescence-filled branches grow from the stems at almost a right angle or in long arches. Shorter branches may ascend rather than arch. Stems and branches can be covered with fine soft hair, but sometimes the amount of hair is reduced farther from the base, mid-stem, or as it goes up the stem. The hair usually grows in vertical lines, particularly on the inflorescence branches.

Leaves
Symphyotrichum lateriflorum has alternate and simple leaves. Characteristics vary among leaves on the same plant and on plants in different environments and areas of the range. Leaves occur at the base, on stems, and on inflorescence branches. The farther away from the base the leaves are, the smaller they become, sometimes markedly so. By the time flowers appear, the leaves at the base and stem have often withered or fallen. Leaves have fine, reticulate veins and little to no hair except for the key characteristic of hair on the back, or abaxial, midrib. This abaxial midrib hair sometimes can all but disappear as the plant ages within a season.

Basal, or bottom, leaves vary in shape from oblanceolate, lance-ovate, ovate, spatulate, to nearly circular. They are thin and the least lance-shaped, with a short or no leafstalk. The surfaces feel slightly rough to the touch, and the edges are wavy or saw-toothed. Leaves may or may not come to a point at the end depending upon their shape.

Lower and middle stem leaves have no leafstalk, meaning they are sessile, or they have a very short leafstalk with wings. The shapes of the stem leaves vary from ovate or elliptic to elliptic-oblanceolate or lanceolate, rarely linear-lanceolate. Sizes become much smaller the farther they grow from the base.

Distal leaves, higher on the stem and on the branches with the flower heads, are also sessile. Their margins are sometimes entire, smooth on the edges with no teeth or lobes. The more distal, the smaller they are, and this change can occur abruptly.

Flowers
Symphyotrichum lateriflorum is a late-summer and fall blooming perennial, the flower heads opening as early as July in some locations and as late as October in others. The flower heads grow in  arrays called panicles and are racemose. They generally stay on the upper sides of their stalks, which are called peduncles. The flower heads at the ends of the peduncles mature approximately one week before those on the rest of the plant.

At the base of a flower head are from one to seven bracts which look like (and technically are) small leaves that grade into the phyllaries.

Involucres and phyllaries
On the outsides of the flower heads of all members of the family Asteraceae are small bracts that look like scales. These are called phyllaries, and together they form the involucre that protects the individual flowers in the head before they open. The involucres of Symphyotrichum lateriflorum are cylinder-bell in shape and usually  in length.

The phyllaries are appressed or slightly spreading. The shape of the outer phyllaries is oblong-lanceolate or oblong-oblanceolate, and the inner phyllaries are linear. The sparsely haired margins of each phyllary may appear white or light green but are translucent or sometimes reddish. The phyllaries have green chlorophyllous zones that are lanceolate, lens-shaped, or diamond-shaped and have green or purplish tips.

Florets
Each flower head is made up of ray florets and disk florets in about a one to one (1:1) ratio, the former developing  before the latter. The  ray florets grow in one series and are usually white, rarely pinkish or purplish.

The disks have  florets that start out as cream or light yellow and after opening, may turn pink, then purple or light brown after pollination. The lobes become strongly reflexed (bent sharply backwards) once open.

Fruit

The fruits (seeds) of Symphyotrichum lateriflorum are not true achenes but are cypselae, resembling an achene and surrounded by a calyx sheath. This is true for all members of the Asteraceae family.

Chromosomes
Symphyotrichum lateriflorum has a base number of eight chromosomes  Diploid, tetraploid, hexaploid, and octaploid plants with respective chromosome counts of 16, 32, 48, and 64 have been reported.

Taxonomy

Classification
Symphyotrichum lateriflorum is a member of the genus Symphyotrichum, and is classified in the subgenus Symphyotrichum, section Symphyotrichum, subsection Dumosi. It is one of the "bushy asters and relatives". Its name with author citations is Symphyotrichum lateriflorum . Swedish botanist Carl Linnaeus, in 1753, was the first to describe what we know today as Symphyotrichum lateriflorum.

Subgenus cladogram

History
In 1748, Linnaeus' apostle Pehr Kalm traveled to North America from Europe. He stayed for two and a half years studying flora and fauna and gathering specimens for study by Linnaeus, returning home in 1751. Kalm's travels in North America took him to Pennsylvania, New Jersey, New York, and southeastern Canada. One of the samples he gathered was described by Linnaeus as Solidago lateriflora, now the basionym of Symphyotrichum lateriflorum. Linnaeus recorded the specimen's origin as "" (Latin for "It grows in North America"), and that it was provided by Kalm. Linnaeus classified this plant in the genus Solidago which now contains over 130 of the many species known today as goldenrods. At that time, Linnaeus sorted fifteen of his available specimens into this genus and included them in his two-volume Species Plantarum (1753).

In 1789, Scottish botanist William Aiton included Solidago lateriflora in his Hortus Kewensis, the first edition of a catalogue of the plants cultivated at Royal Botanic Gardens, Kew, where he had been the director since 1759. In separate entries, he also described an Aster diffusus, Aster divergens, and Aster miser, all as separate species definitions from Solidago lateriflora. The Plants of the World Online (POWO) entry for Symphyotrichum lateriflorum includes Aster diffusus  as a synonym, but not Aster miser  or Aster miser . It does include Aster miser  which was described by English naturalist Thomas Nuttall in 1818. Aster divergens  is also listed as a taxonomic synonym.

It was not until 1889 that American botanist Nathaniel Lord Britton combined Solidago lateriflora  with Aster species, identifying Aster diffusus  and Aster miser  as the same. This resulted in one species named Aster lateriflorus , with Solidago lateriflora  as the basionym, as it had been the first described. Other names and combinations occurred before and after this, but Aster lateriflorus was the only one associated with the original Solidago lateriflora until the broad and polyphyletic circumscription of the genus Aster was divided. Aster lateriflorus  was moved to the genus Symphyotrichum in 1982 by Áskell and Doris Löve during their study of plant chromosomes making its binomial name Symphyotrichum lateriflorum  where it currently remains. The infraspecies were subsequently moved by American botanist Guy L. Nesom in 1994.

In a 1928 study of Aster lateriflorus and close relatives, while pondering the "endless confusion in the naming of specimens" of this species, American botanist Karl McKay Wiegand noted how environmental differences likely affected leaf and flower head characteristics, causing botanists to name specimens of this plant as different varieties or species when they may not have been. In this study, Wiegand compared characteristics among the specimens which largely had been ignored up to that point, namely, "the exact length of the involucre and the inner involucral bracts, the number of rays, and the shape of the limb in the disk-corolla as well as the length and character of its lobes."

Varieties
The Catalogue of Life (COL) recognized six varieties of Symphyotrichum lateriflorum  on its 2009 Annual Checklist. By 2017, all had been reduced to taxonomic synonyms.  hirsuticaule was reduced five years prior, in 2012. According to Flora of North America, "[m]uch genetic and phenotypic variation is encountered within the complex; a thorough study is needed before a coherent taxonomy can be achieved."

Although the following varieties are neither accepted by COL nor POWO, they were accepted  by one or more of USDA PLANTS Database, NatureServe, World Flora Online (WFO), Integrated Taxonomic Information System (ITIS), and Database of Vascular Plants of Canada (VASCAN). The autonym is Symphyotrichum lateriflorum var. lateriflorum.

Variety angustifolium

Symphyotrichum lateriflorum var. angustifolium  is commonly known as narrow-leaved calico aster. Latin  means narrow and  means foliage or leaves. In 1903, American botanist Edward Sandford Burgess described a new species he named Aster agrostifolius which, along with other characteristics, had very thin grass-like leaves. Latin  means grass. He was noted that " may be nothing more than a separation of the narrow leaved individuals of the typical form." After Nesom reclassified the varieties from genus Aster to Symphyotrichum,  angustifolium was created, and the two former taxa became its taxonomic synonyms.

Variety flagellare
In 1953, Canadian-American botanist Lloyd Herbert Shinners named specimens as two new varieties of Aster lateriflorus:  flagellaris  and  indutus . In his protologues, Shinners said specifically that both had deeply lobed disk corollas and no rhizomes, and these characteristics were his reasoning for placing them both with A. lateriflorus.

Regarding leaf characteristics, Shinners stated that  lateriflorus,  angustifolius, and  pendulus all had pubescent abaxial midribs, but did not say that his two new varieties had the same. He said the opposite: in the protologue for  flagellaris, Shinners wrote in Latin "", which in English is "leaves totally glabrous on the abaxial side." Thus, no hair abaxially on the leaves of this variety. In the  indutus protologue, Shinners wrote "", translated to English is "leaves with some hairs on the abaxial side, on the adaxial side densely scabrous." There is no mention of an exclusivity of hair on its midrib either.

The type specimens of  flagellaris and  indutus were both collected in Texas, the former in 1947 in Henderson County, and the latter in 1946, two miles southeast of Daingerfield, which is in Morris County. Shinners was working from only the type specimen for  indutus, and he viewed multiple specimens for  flagellaris, mostly from Texas, and one from McCurtain County, Oklahoma, which is the southeasternmost county of that state and on the north side of the Red River of the South bordering Texas. 

Specimens collected by American botanist Alfred Traverse in Harris County, Texas, and verified by Shinners as  flagellaris are stored at the Botanical Research Institute of Texas Philecology Herbarium, as is one collected in 1934 by American botanist Eula Whitehouse at the Ottine wetlands in Gonzales County, Texas, and determined by German-American botanist Almut Gitter Jones to be  indutus. The current name of Symphyotrichum lateriflorum var. flagellare  was created in 1994, and the two prior taxa became its taxonomic synonyms.

Variety hirsuticaule

Symphyotrichum lateriflorum var. hirsuticaule  is known as rough-stemmed calico aster and starved aster. Aster hirsuticaulis, its basionym, was originally published by Swiss botanist Augustin Pyramus de Candolle in 1836 as having been defined by English botanist John Lindley. Latin   translates to hairy stem. An abundance of flower cluster stem hair ("") and the existence of abaxial leaf rib hair ("") were both in the Latin protologue published by de Candolle.

Subsequent authorities reduced Aster hirsuticaulis to infraspecies. American botanists John Torrey and Asa Gray did so first in 1841 with  hirsuticaulis, using the abaxial pubescent or hirsute (very hairy) midrib as a primary defining factor. They also stated that the leaves of the variety were "more or less hirsute". Gray followed up in 1884 with  hirsuticaulis. Here, Gray specified an environmental factor, "probably growing in much shade", also writing that the abaxial midrib and the stem were "very hirsute".

He stated that these forms "", in English, "are just luxurious plants growing at shady and moist places, less branched and taller". That same year, Pennsylvania botanist Thomas Conrad Porter reduced  to a variety of Britton's  which took precedence. After Nesom reclassified the varieties from genus Aster to Symphyotrichum, these became taxonomic synonyms of the new  hirsuticaule.

Variety horizontale

Symphyotrichum lateriflorum var. horizontale  is commonly called horizontal calico aster. It has been in cultivation in Europe since the mid-1700s, and possibly before. The protologue for the earliest taxonomic synonym, Aster pendulus, was by William Aiton in 1789 who stated that the plant he was describing was cultivated in 1758 by English botanist Philip Miller who was chief gardener at the Chelsea Physic Garden from 1722 to 1770.

In 1833, American botanist Lewis Caleb Beck created  pendulus from  His short description states that the leaves of the branches are "rather remote". In 1884, Asa Gray placed this as a variety of  His description included that it was a "cultivated form ... a plant of the gardens, not exactly matched by indigenous specimens, but evidently of this species."

American botanist Oliver Atkins Farwell placed Aster horizontalis  as a variety of  describing it in 1895 as "a tall plant with long straggling horizontal branches." In 1898, Burgess reduced  to a variety of Aster lateriflorus. Finally, Nesom created Symphyotrichum lateriflorum var. horizontale when he moved the varieties to genus Symphyotrichum. Its taxonomic synonyms are listed as Aster horizontalis ,  horizontalis ,  horizontalis , and  pendulus . The Royal Horticultural Society (RHS) presents an Award of Garden Merit as a "seal of approval that the plant performs reliably in the garden." This variety is cultivated and marketed as an ornamental garden plant in Europe and gained this award in 1993.

Variety spatelliforme

Symphyotrichum lateriflorum var. spatelliforme  was described by Burgess in 1903 as species Aster spatelliformis, making it the basionym of this variety. Burgess' protologue primarily focused on leaf characteristics which he said were how it differed from  Leaves were described, in part, as small, rounded, and spatulate-shaped, with fine, reticulate veins and a short wedge-shaped base.

In 1984, Almut Gitter Jones reduced Aster spatelliformis to a variety of  In 1982, Löve and Löve began moving species to the genus Symphyotrichum. Two years before, in 1980, Jones had placed Symphyotrichum as a subgenus of Aster. It was not until Nesom's evaluation of Aster sensu lato in 1994 that Jones' subgenus was combined with the genus. After this, Symphyotrichum lateriflorum var. spatelliforme was created, and the two former taxa became its taxonomic synonyms.

Variety tenuipes

Symphyotrichum lateriflorum var. tenuipes  is commonly called slender-stalked calico aster. Wiegand first described it as a variety in 1928,  tenuipes , with slender and "somewhat zigzag" stems, larger heads, and longer rays than the standard form of the species.

In 1943, Shinners promoted the variety to species level as Aster tenuipes , specifying that it lacked the "pubescent midveins" of  This name had been in use since 1898 as  native to Japan. The following year, Shinners renamed his to Aster acadiensis . Nesom created Symphyotrichum lateriflorum var. tenuipes when he moved the varieties to genus Symphyotrichum.

Hybrids
The following naturally occurring hybrids have been reported:

Etymology
The specific epithet (second part of the scientific name) lateriflorum is a combination of the Latin words for side (literally meaning flank) and flower, so named because the flowers are seen to grow on one side of the branches. Symphyotrichum lateriflorum is commonly known as calico aster, starved aster, white woodland aster, side-flowering aster, side-flower aster, goblet aster, one-side aster, one-sided aster, farewell summer, and calico American-aster. Along with other asters that bloom in the fall,  may be called a Michaelmas daisy. There are Indigenous American names for this plant including the Meskwaki word  and the Potawatomi word , both as spelled by ethnobotanist Huron Herbert Smith.

Aster comes from the Ancient Greek word  (astḗr), meaning star, referring to the shape of the flower. An old common name for Astereae species using the suffix -wort is starwort, also spelled  or star wort. The name  was in use by Aiton in his 1789 Hortus Kewensis. Scientific names that were later changed to be taxonomic synonyms of Symphyotrichum lateriflorum had common names such as diffuse white-flower'd star-wort and pendulus star-wort in this work (Aster diffusus and Aster pendulus, respectively).

Distribution and habitat

Distribution
Symphyotrichum lateriflorum has been found in the wild in the United States in all states east of the Mississippi River; in the states on the west Mississippi River bank (Minnesota, Iowa, Missouri, Arkansas, and Louisiana); and, in the western states of South Dakota, Nebraska, Kansas, Oklahoma, and Texas. It is also present in the Canadian provinces of Manitoba, Ontario, Quebec, New Brunswick, and Prince Edward Island. In Mexico, it is present in the state of Veracruz.  is native throughout its current North American range. The USDA PLANTS Database records a presence in British Columbia, but Flora of North America states that it was an ephemeral there that did not persist. Varietal distributions have been recorded as follows:
  angustifolium has been found in Ontario, as well as in the U.S. region of New England except Rhode Island, and in the states of Indiana, Kentucky, Michigan, New Jersey, New York, and Wisconsin.
  flagellare is documented in Oklahoma and Texas.
  hirsuticaule is documented in Ontario, Nova Scotia, Prince Edward Island, and New Brunswick. Because it is considered a taxonomic synonym and not a variety of the species in most databases, United States distribution data cannot be found.
  horizontale has been found in New Brunswick, and in all U.S. states east of the Mississippi River excluding Indiana, Ohio, Virginia, South Carolina, and Louisiana. Also present west of the Mississippi in Minnesota, Missouri, and Arkansas.
  spatelliforme has been found in Florida.
  tenuipes is known from Nova Scotia, Prince Edward Island, Maine, Michigan, New Hampshire, New York, and Vermont.

 is reported as an introduced species in Belgium, France, Italy, and Switzerland. , it was not on the European Union's List of invasive alien species of Union concern.

Habitat
Habitat can vary considerably, including wet to dry-mesic woodlands and savannas, floodplain woodlands, fens, marshes, wet to wet-mesic prairies, and high water table old fields. Symphyotrichum lateriflorum has been found on banks, in thickets, and on shores usually in rather dry, but also in damp or even wet, sandy or gravelly soil.  is categorized on the United States National Wetland Plant List (NWPL) with Wetland Indicator Status Ratings of Facultative Wetland (FACW) and Facultative (FAC), depending on wetland region. In the Atlantic and Gulf Coastal Plain (AGCP) and Northcentral and Northeast (NCNE) regions, it is a Facultative Plant (FAC), choosing wetlands or non-wetlands and adjusting accordingly. In the Eastern Mountains and Piedmont (EMP), Great Plains (GP), and Midwest (MW) regions, it is a Facultative Wetland Plant (FACW), usually occurring in wetlands, but not out of necessity. In these regions, it is less likely to, but may choose non-wetlands.

Companions or associates depend upon the environment where Symphyotrichum lateriflorum is growing. Nearby naturally occurring native North American trees can include silver maple (Acer saccharinum), ash-leaved maple or boxelder (Acer negundo), common hackberry (Celtis occidentalis), downy hawthorn (Crataegus mollis), the critically endangered green ash (Fraxinus pennsylvanica), common elderberry (Sambucus canadensis), and the endangered American elm (Ulmus americana). Some companion Symphyotrichum species are Drummond's aster  shining aster  panicled aster  New England aster  and purplestem aster

Ecology
Symphyotrichum lateriflorum is considered a weed species in Canada and the United States. It is not considered a noxious weed in either country. Canadian botanists Jerry G. Chmielewski and John C. Semple called it "probably the least weedy of the weedy aster species in Canada."  has coefficients of conservatism  in the Floristic Quality Assessment (FQA) that range from  depending on evaluation region. The lower the  the higher tolerance the species has for disturbance. In the case of a low  there is lesser likelihood that the plant is growing in an undisturbed or remnant habitat with native flora and fauna.

Reproduction
Calico aster's primary means of reproduction is through pollination, which occurs with the help of short or mid-length tongued insects that are able to manipulate the small flower heads successfully and transfer pollen from one plant to another. The use of pollen from one plant to fertilize another is called cross-pollination and is required by this species. Any occasional self-pollination produces only a few viable seeds. As an adaptive mechanism, the flower heads of Symphyotrichum lateriflorum "go to sleep" at night. The flower heads close the ray florets around the disk florets. This may help protect and preserve the pollen within. Reproduction also can occur through cloning via the plant's short rhizomatic structure. Typically, this causes the formation of small groups rather than large colonies, because  is not a large colony-producing species. It is more likely for any vegetative reproduction (non-seed reproduction) to form within a clump.

Ray florets in the Symphyotrichum genus are exclusively female, each having a pistil (with style, stigma, and ovary) but no stamen. Ray florets accept pollen and each can develop a seed, but they produce no pollen. The ray florets of  bloom earlier and are likely receptive to pollen longer than the disk florets.

Each ray floret has three petals which are fused together to form a corolla. The floret has one ovary at the bottom, and this ovary contains one ovule. The ovary has an attached style that extends outward from between the ray floret corolla and the rest of the flower head. As the ray floret is blooming, the stigma at the top of the style splits into two lobes to allow pollen to access the ovary.

Disk florets in the Symphyotrichum genus are androgynous, each with both male (stamen, anthers, and filaments) and female reproductive parts; thus, a disk floret produces pollen and can develop a seed. The disk floret has five petals, sometimes referred to as lobes, which are fused into its own corolla in the shape of a tube.

The male stamen is inside the tube-shaped corolla of the disk floret. It has five anthers, five filaments, and produces pollen. The anthers and filaments are readily visible as separate entities in non-Asteraceae species. Here, they are fused together to form a cylinder, or tube, with their pollen on the inside only. This male anther cylinder surrounds the female style and stigma. As the style is maturing, it elongates up through the anther cylinder, gathering the pollen on its stigma along the way.

The ovary is at the bottom of the disk floret style. As with the ray floret, the disk floret stigma has two lobes that are fused together. The disk floret's stigma stays closed while pollen is on it, keeping its ovary safe from self-pollination. After the pollen has been collected and carried off by one or more pollinators, the stigma begins to split into two lobes, opening the style so that the disk floret ovary becomes accessible to receive pollen from another plant.

They are then wind dispersed. Usually, the seeds will have their dried corollas attached as they depart.

Pollinators and nectar-seekers

Pollinators and nectar-seekers include short and mid-length tongued insects such as common eastern bumblebee (Bombus impatiens), European honeybee (Apis mellifera), eastern yellowjacket (Vespula maculifrons), bald-faced hornet (Dolichovespula maculata), cloudy-winged miner bee (Andrena nubecula), the miner bees Pseudopanurgus andrenoides and Pseudopanurgus compositarum, and the apoid wasp Cerceris kennicottii.

Sweat bees and hoverflies also visit the flowers. Some that have been recorded include the bristle sweat bee (Lasioglossum imitatum), Cresson's metallic sweat bee (Lasioglossum cressonii), experienced sweat bee (Lasioglossum versatum), golden green sweat bee (Augochlorella aurata), leathery sweat bee (Lasioglossum coriaceum), nightmare sweat bee (Lasioglossum ephialtum), and pure golden green sweat bee (Augochlora pura). The hoverfly species Eristalis arbustorum, Eristalis dimidiata, and the calligrapher fly (Toxomerus marginatus) also have been recorded visiting the flowers.

Pests and diseases

Banded woolly bear caterpillars (larvae of the isabella tiger moth Pyrrharctia isabella) eat the leaves, as does the larvae of the green owlet (Leuconycta diphteroides). Symphyotrichum lateriflorum is also host to the pearl crescent butterfly (Phyciodes tharos) and the silvery checkerspot (Charidryas harrisii). Leaf miners also eat the leaves, including the leaf blotch miner Acrocercops astericola and the "trumpet" leaf miner Astrotischeria astericola. The larvae of the Coleophora silk case-bearing moth Coleophora dextrella feed on the seeds, and the galls produced by the midge Rhopalomyia lateriflori occur in the axillary buds where their larvae can develop.

Conservation
NatureServe lists Symphyotrichum lateriflorum as Secure (G5) worldwide, and  lateriflorum is Critically Imperiled (S1) in Kansas and Nebraska.  angustifolium is possibly Imperiled (S2) in Kentucky, and  horizontale is Imperiled (S2) in New Jersey.

Uses

Medicinal
In 1928, ethnobotanist Huron Herbert Smith documented the Meskwaki use of this plant as a psychological aid using the "blossoms as a smudge 'to cure a crazy person who has lost his mind'", and as an herbal steam using the entire plant "as a smoke or steam in sweatbath". Both words mean "smoke a person". In her 1979 book Use of Plants for the Past 500 Years, Charlotte  documented that the Mohawk people use an infusion of this plant with Symphyotrichum novae-angliae to treat fever.

Gardening
Symphyotrichum lateriflorum is said to be hardy to USDA Zone 3 (to ). An adult plant can be propagated by division of the rootstock, although this is needed only every few years. It will grow well in shade or sun, and in any soil with some moisture.

The earliest record of the species in gardens was of a taxonomic synonym of  horizontale called Aster pendulus. It was cultivated by Philip Miller by 1758. Miller was chief gardener at the Chelsea Physic Garden from 1722 to 1770. A physic garden is one devoted to medicinal plants. This variety is still often called  horizontalis and is sometimes labeled in cultivar form as 'Horizontalis'.  horizontale gained the RHS Award of Garden Merit in 1993.

Symphyotrichum lateriflorum var. horizontale is listed as very hardy with RHS Hardiness Rating H7, which is to below . The RHS Plant Finder suggests it for flower borders and beds of cottage and informal gardens, growing in an open location with full sun and well-drained moderately fertile soil.

Cultivars
Marketed cultivars of calico aster can be found using common names and the current and previous scientific names. Below is an alphabetical list of some probable or definite cultivars of Symphyotrichum lateriflorum with descriptions and history when available.

 has  diameter flowers that have white rays with pink to purple disks, and leaves with " tints".

 is listed as a cultivar of  lateriflorum and is without description in the RHS Plant Finder . It was introduced as early as 1910 as a cultivar of Aster vimineus.

, last listed in the 2000 RHS Plant Finder, is without description .

 has an active listing in the RHS Plant Finder .

, found in the RHS Plant Finder simply as Symphyotrichum 'Coombe Fishacre' without a species name, won the RHS Award of Garden Merit in 1993. It has multiple common or marketing synonyms and is offered both as a cultivar of Aster novi-belgii (Symphyotrichum novi-belgii, New York Aster) and as a hybrid of both. RHS shows another synonym, Aster coelestis 'Coombe Fishacre'.  horizontalis was its parent according to the following passage from the periodical Gardening World Illustrated (1898). That variety is the  horizontale of today.
The comparatively new variety [of Michaelmas Daisy], Coombe Fishacre, which was raised by Mr. Archer Hind, is in magnificent condition at Long Ditton at the present time, and the plants are conspicuous amongst all the rest by reason of their extreme floriferousness. The bronzy-red and white flowers much resemble those of  horizontalis, its parent, but they are larger and finer. The height is about 

 was introduced in 1993 and has green leaves and bushy branches of flower heads that are  diameter, with white rays and pale yellow disks. It was last listed in the RHS Plant Finder in 1997.

 was last listed in the RHS Plant Finder in 2018. According to Paul Picton, author of The Gardener's Guide to Growing Asters, 'Datschi' was introduced before 1920. There was a cultivar named Datschi in the RHS Autumn 1919 trials at Wisely assigned to their type diffusus, which is not explicitly said to be an Aster diffusus cultivar but is more descriptive of that growing habit. It had single white flowers reported as  inch diameter that bloomed from 23 October 1919–5 November 1919, and it reached a height of 

 was last listed in the RHS Plant Finder in 2007. It was introduced before 1902.

 is listed as a cultivar of  lateriflorum and is without description in the RHS Plant Finder .

, introduced in 1992, has large flower heads for a cultivar of this species at  diameter.

 was introduced in 1991. It has bronze and dark purple leaves with flowers that have white rays and  centers.

 is listed in the RHS Plant Finder .

 is listed as a cultivar of  lateriflorum and is without description in the RHS Plant Finder . Picton lists it as a cultivar of Aster vimineus dating to as early as 1910.

It has dark purple foliage with  diameter flower heads.

 is listed as a cultivar of  lateriflorum and is without description in the RHS Plant Finder . Picton lists 'Prince Charming' as a cultivar of Aster vimineus dating to as early as 1910.

 was last listed in the 2001 RHS Plant Finder. Translated from Latin,  means red leaf or red foliage. No description was readily available about this cultivar .

Notes

Citations

References

External links

 Calico Aster at Illinois Wildflowers
 Calico Aster at Minnesota Wildflowers
 Calico Aster at Ontario Wildflowers
 Symphyotrichum lateriflorum at Ladybird Johnson Wildflower Center (wildflower.org)
 Symphyotrichum lateriflorum at John C. Semple's Asteraea Lab website

lateriflorum
Flora of Eastern Canada
Flora of Manitoba
Flora of the North-Central United States
Flora of the Northeastern United States
Flora of the Southeastern United States
Flora of Texas
Flora of Veracruz
Garden plants of North America
Plants used in traditional Native American medicine
Plants described in 1753
Taxa named by Carl Linnaeus